Bad Day at Riverbend is a 1995 children's book by American writer Chris Van Allsburg.

Plot 
On a quiet day at the town of Riverbend, local sheriff Ned Hardy hears that a strange matter is covering many citizens. When he heads out to investigate, he finds the local stagecoach driver covered in this mass and unable to speak. Distraught but unwilling to surrender, Hardy heads on and finds more people covered in this substance. Eventually he is himself covered in this substance and unable to move or speak.

It is then revealed that the strange matter was none other than crayon scribbles, and that the sheriff is part of a coloring book left on its own by a small boy who gets tired and leaves.

References 

1995 children's books
American picture books
Picture books by Chris Van Allsburg